Nektarios Santorinios (17 May 1972 – 13 February 2023) was a Greek politician. A member of Syriza, he served in the Hellenic Parliament from 2015 to 2023.

Santorinios died of cancer in Rhodes on 13 February 2023, at the age of 50.

References

1972 births
2023 deaths 
Deaths from cancer in Greece
Syriza politicians
Greek MPs 2015–2019
Greek MPs 2019–2023
National Technical University of Athens alumni
People from Rhodes